Elektrometalurh Stadium is a multi-use stadium in Nikopol, Ukraine. The stadium holds 7,200 people.

The stadium is located close to the Kakhovka Reservoir in the city's Park Peremohy.

The stadium was a home stadium of FC Metalurh Nikopol. Currently it houses FC Nikopol.

Gallery

References

External links
 Elektrometalurh Stadium. Europlan.

Football venues in Dnipropetrovsk Oblast
Sport in Nikopol, Ukraine